The Chesapeake Climate Action Network (CCAN) is a grassroots nonprofit organization dedicated to fighting global warming in Maryland, Virginia, and the District of Columbia. The organization's mission is to foster a rapid societal switch to clean energy and energy-efficient products, joining similar efforts worldwide to address global warming.

Background

The Chesapeake Climate Action Network was launched on July 1, 2002, with a seed grant from the Rockefeller Brothers Fund.

Working with a large and growing network of allies, the group helped pass an Offshore Wind Bill in Maryland, statewide carbon caps in Maryland, clean cars bills in Maryland and the District of Columbia, renewable energy standard bills in Maryland, Virginia, and the District of Columbia.

References

See also
Climate change in Maryland
Climate change in Virginia
Climate change in Washington, D.C.

Environment of Maryland
Climate change organizations based in the United States
Companies based in Takoma Park, Maryland
Non-profit organizations based in Maryland
2002 establishments in Maryland